Howmeh Rural District is in the Central District of Bushehr County, Bushehr province, Iran. At the census of 2006, its population was 27,156 in 6,385 households; there were 35,525 inhabitants in 9,607 households at the following census of 2011; and in the most recent census of 2016, the population of the rural district was 22,766 in 6,628 households. The largest of its 16 villages was Doveyreh, with 4,096 people.

References 

Rural Districts of Bushehr Province
Populated places in Bushehr County